Tunagyna is a monotypic genus of sheet weavers containing the single species, Tunagyna debilis. It was first described by Ralph Vary Chamberlin & Vaine Wilton Ivie in 1933, and is found in the United States, Canada, and Russia.

See also
 List of Linyphiidae species (Q–Z)

References

Linyphiidae
Monotypic Araneomorphae genera
Spiders of North America
Spiders of Russia